The Billings Symphony Orchestra is an American orchestra based in Billings, Montana.

The Symphony was founded in 1950, and the chorale was founded in 1955. The Billings Symphony serves South Central Montana, Eastern Montana and Northern Wyoming as the only symphony and chorale in the region. The Billings Symphony Orchestra regularly performs at the Alberta Bair Theater.

Conductors 
1950 to 1955 - Robert Staffanson 
1955 to 1984 - George Perkins
1984 to 2004 - Uri Barnea (First full-time music director & Conductor.) 
2005 to Present - Anne Harrigan

References

External links 
Billings Symphony
Billings Symphony Music for Oboe and Orchestra
Anne Harrigan biography page

Musical groups established in 1950
American orchestras
Musical groups from Montana
Billings metropolitan area
1950 establishments in Montana
Performing arts in Montana